The Women's 25 metre pistol singles event at the 2010 Commonwealth Games took place on 6 October 2010 at the CRPF Campus. There was a qualification round held to determine the final participants.

Results

External links
Report

Shooting at the 2010 Commonwealth Games
Comm